The Passionate Plumber is a 1932 American pre-Code comedy film directed by Edward Sedgwick, and starring Buster Keaton, Jimmy Durante, and Irene Purcell. The screenplay by Laurence E. Johnson and Ralph Spence is based on the 1926 play Dans sa candeur naïve by Jacques Deval. It is the second screen adaptation of the play, following the 1928 silent film The Cardboard Lover. It later was remade in 1942 as Her Cardboard Lover.

A French-language version was made at the same time, under the title, Le plombier amoureux.
The dueling sequence was reworked in two of Keaton's later short subjects, She's Oil Mine from 1941 and the 1947 Un Duel A Mort made in France.

Plot
Paris plumber Elmer Tuttle is enlisted by socialite Patricia Alden to help make her lover Tony Lagorce jealous. With the help of his friend Julius J. McCracken, and through the high society contacts he has made through Patricia, Elmer hopes to find financing for his latest invention, a pistol with a target-illuminating light. Comic complications ensue when Elmer's effort to interest a military leader is misconstrued as an assassination attempt.

Cast
 Buster Keaton as Elmer E. Tuttle
 Jimmy Durante as Julius J. McCracken
 Irene Purcell as Patricia Alden
 Polly Moran as Albine
 Gilbert Roland as Tony Lagorce
 Mona Maris as Nina Estrada
 Maude Eburne as Aunt Charlotte
 Henry Armetta as Bouncer
 Paul Porcasi as Paul Le Maire
 Jean Del Val as Chauffeur
 August Tollaire as General Bouschay
 Edward Brophy as Pedestrian

Critical reception
Variety observed: "There is some comedy of merit in this flimsy scenario, stretched from a natural two-reel length to fill a full-length spool, and it isn't necessary to gaze beyond the cast to find the source. But the cast and the laughs are constantly obliged to fight the plot and motives; unfortunately, the plot wins the battle, contrary to the picture's best interests. ... While Durante and Keaton are cross-firing for laughs, the rest is momentarily laid aside, and when the chief laugh grabbers return to the theme, they don't mix. Polly Moran hasn't much to do, which is the picture's biggest disappointment." The New York Times gave a positive review.

References

External links

1932 films
American screwball comedy films
1932 comedy films
American films based on plays
Films based on works by Jacques Deval
Films set in Paris
1930s English-language films
American black-and-white films
Films directed by Edward Sedgwick
Metro-Goldwyn-Mayer films
Films produced by Harry Rapf
Remakes of American films
Sound film remakes of silent films
1930s American films